Battle, Capture, Fall, or Siege of Baghdad may refer to:
 Siege of Baghdad (812–813), during the Fourth Fitna (Islamic Civil War)
 Siege of Baghdad (865), during the Fifth Fitna
 Battle of Baghdad (946), Buyid–Hamdanid War
 Siege of Baghdad (1136), by the Seljuks
 Siege of Baghdad (1157), by the Seljuks
 Siege of Baghdad (1258), Mongol conquest of Baghdad
 Siege of Baghdad (1393), by Tamerlane
 Siege of Baghdad (1401), by Tamerlane
 Capture of Baghdad (1534), Ottoman–Safavid Wars
 Capture of Baghdad (1624), Ottoman–Safavid Wars
 Siege of Baghdad (1625), Ottoman–Safavid Wars
 Capture of Baghdad (1638), Ottoman–Safavid Wars
 Siege of Baghdad (1733), Ottoman-Persian Wars
 Fall of Baghdad (1917), World War I
 Battle of Baghdad (2003), United States invasion of Iraq
 Battle of Baghdad (2006–2008), Iraq War

Sieges of Baghdad